Hossain Zillur Rahman is an academic, economist and policy maker from Bangladesh. Combining degrees in economics (Masters, Dhaka University) and political sociology (Ph.D, Manchester University), Hossain Zillur Rahman is a leading policy voice on poverty, governance, social protection, education, social protection, urbanization and political development. He led the drafting of the poverty reduction strategy of the government in 2005 and was a member of the Independent South Asian Commission on Poverty Alleviation (ISACPA). He founded the Dhaka-based think-tank Power and Participation Research Centre (PPRC) in 1996 and prior to that was for over twenty years a leading researcher at the Bangladesh Institute of development Studies.

On 9 January 2008, he was appointed as an adviser (cabinet minister) to the Caretaker Government of Bangladesh, led by Fakhruddin Ahmed and was entrusted with the ministries of commerce and education. He served in this capacity till evening of 6 January 2009. He was instrumental in driving a political negotiation process between the Caretaker government and the army on one hand and the two major political parties, Awami League and Bangladesh Nationalist Party (BNP) on the other that led to the successful election of 29 December 2008. For this, he is credited with a lead role in the successful return of Bangladesh to electoral democracy. He was an Inspire Fellow at the Institute for Global Leadership at Tufts University, USA and was awarded the Dr. John Meyer Global Citizenship Award by the Institute in November, 2009.

In 2013, he was awarded Gold Medal by Rotary International Bangladesh. Hossain Zillur Rahman has been a regular resource person at the National Defence College in Dhaka since its inception in 1999. In 2011 Hossain Zillur established the research-based civic platform - Chittagong Research Initiative (CRI). He is the convener of two new civic platforms - SROTA (Safe Roads and Transport Alliance) launched on 8 October 2016 and HEALTHY BANGLADESH launched on 13 May 2017.  Currently the Executive Chairman of Power and Participation Research Centre (PPRC) (www.pprc-bd.org), Hossain Zillur's newest area of engagement is sustainable health-care, urban poverty and urban innovations.

Education
Born in Chittagong, Hossain Zillur Rahman took his Senior Cambridge examinations from the P.A.F. College, Sargodha in Pakistan and higher secondary certificate from Faujdarhat Cadet College in Chittagong, Bangladesh. He studied Economics at the Dhaka University for his Bachelors and Masters. He received his PhD in Sociology from the Manchester University in 1986. His PhD research focused on the sociology of colonial rule and emergence of the state in Bangladesh. He studied power, property and institutions those are new area of Economics.

Works and achievement
Hossain Zillur Rahman was for twenty years a leading researcher at the Bangladesh Institute of Development Studies (www.bids-bd.org) before founding the independent think tank Power and Participation Research Centre (PPRC) (www.pprcbd.org) in 1996. As a poverty researcher, he played a major role in bringing to national attention the problem of extreme poverty. He was Lead Consultant in the preparation of the poverty reduction strategy document (PRSP) of the government of Bangladesh in 2005 and was a member of the SAARC Poverty Commission (ISACPA) (2003-2007). He undertook innovative research that brought into prominence the issue of local governance and helped to set up the advocacy platform Local Government Support Group that had Professor Muhammad Yunus in the Chair. He worked on Board of Advisors of Digital Network, a think tank on Information Technology. He sat on the Board of the Bangladesh Bank (central bank of Bangladesh) between 2005–2007. He was chairman of Mass-Line Media Centre, a media advocacy organization. He has been a consultant to various international and national organisations including the World Bank, Asian Development Bank, the UK Department for International Development, Danish International Development Agency, Swedish International Development Cooperation Agency, Sustainable Development Commission, ActionAid, Japan International Cooperation Agency, International Food Policy Research Institute and Japan Bank for International Cooperation. He is a regular resource person at the National Defence College in Dhaka, Bangladesh. He was made an Advisor (cabinet minister) in the Caretaker Government of Bangladesh in 2008. Since resuming stewardship of PPRC, he has been a major influence in promoting a national social protection strategy for Bangladesh. Dr. Rahman has also emerged as an important new policy voice on urban issues. Since 2011, he has spearheaded a research-based civic action platform - Chittagong Research Initiative (CRi) - that aims to promote the national port city as a future global city. He is currently elected as chairman of BRAC, the leading and largest NGO in Bangladesh.

Assignment in the Caretaker government
On 9 January 2008, Dr. Hossain Zillur Rahman was appointed as an Advisor to the Caretaker government of Bangladesh that was established on 11 January 2007. On 10 January 2008 portfolio of the advisers was redistributed and he was given the charge of the Ministry of Commerce as well as the Ministry of Education. On appointment as an advisor to the government, Dr. Rahman commented : "We have taken up the tasks in a critical times. But we can succeed if we work together." He also added : "Reforms are going on at the national level. Prices are rising on the international market.... The main dimension of work was thought to be political, but now it seems it is economy-oriented." "We will try to work together. Let's see what happens," he added. He played the most vital role in reaching an understanding between the Caretaker government on the one hand and the two main political parties, namely, Bangladesh Awami League and Bangladesh Nationalist Party towards transition to democracy through a free and fair election held on 29 December 2008. His career as an advisor came to end on 6 January 2009 as a new government was formed. He was more a political advisor than a Commerce or Education advisor. He earned popularity as a very composed person who can make a press statement in an impressive way.

Research interests
Dr. Rahman led the internationally known Analysis of the Poverty Trends Project of the Bangladesh Institute of Development Studies (1989–98). In addition to poverty alleviation, he takes profound interest in governance problems of the less developed countries. He is a social scientist with interest in the dynamics of the society and the reasons behind.

Family
Hossain Zillur Rahman has 3 daughters with his wife Mahbuba Haque.

Publications
 Rethinking Rural Poverty: Bangladesh as a Case Study, 1995, (with Mahbub Hossain) SAGE International India Pvt.Ltd.
 Local Governance and Community Capacities : Search for New Frontiers, (Hossain Zillur Rahman with S. Aminul Islam), 2002: University Press Limited, Dhaka.
 Governance and State Effectiveness in Asia, 2006 (with Mark Robinson), Power and Participation Research Centre (Dhaka, Bangladesh) & IDS (Sussex)
 Researching Poverty From the Bottom Up, Reflections on the Experience of the Programme for Research on Poverty Alleviation 1994–2002, edited by Hossion Zillur Rahman with Khondoker Shakhawat Ali, PPRC and Grameen Trust, 2007, Dhaka.
 Unbundling Governance: Indices, Institutions, Solutions, 2007, Power and Participation Research Centre (Dhaka, Bangladesh)
 Bangladesh Urban Dynamics, 2012, Power and Participation Research Centre (Dhaka, Bangladesh)
 Social Protection in Bangladesh, 2014, (with David Hulme et al.), University Press Limited, Dhaka
 Rethinking Local Governance   towards a Livelihoods Focus, 2001: Power and Participation Research Centre.

References

Bangladeshi economists
Living people
Advisors of Caretaker Government of Bangladesh
1951 births
Faujdarhat Cadet College alumni